Paphiopedilum villosum is a species of orchid found Assam, southern China and the Myanmar states of Kachin, Kayar, Shan and the Upper Sagaing region. The population is declining across its range and the species is listed as vulnerable by the IUCN due to habitat degradation and poaching for the global plant trade.

References

villosum